Spergo parunculis is a species of sea snail, a marine gastropod mollusk in the family Raphitomidae.

Description
The shell reaches a length of 84 mm.

Distribution
This marine species occurs in the Mozambique Channel.

References

 Stahlschmidt P., Chino M. & Fraussen K. (2015). A new Spergo species (Conoidea: Raphitomidae) from the Mozambique Channel. Miscellanea Malacologica. 7(1): 9-12.

External links
 Gastropods.com: Spergo parunculis
 Criscione, F.; Hallan, A.; Fedosov, A.; Puillandre, N. (2021). Deep Downunder: Integrative taxonomy of Austrobela, Spergo, Theta and Austrotheta (Gastropoda: Conoidea: Raphitomidae) from the deep sea of Australia. Journal of Zoological Systematics and Evolutionary Research. DOI 10.1111/jzs.12512

parunculis
Gastropods described in 2015